Bartolommeo Calomato (17th century) was an Italian painter active in Venice. He was remarkable for his small genre pictures representing scenes from town and country life, enlivened with figures.

References

17th-century Italian painters
Italian male painters
Italian Baroque painters
Painters from Venice
Year of birth missing
Year of death missing